Oddvar Klepperås  is a Norwegian handball player.

He made his debut on the Norwegian national team in 1955, 
and played 61 matches for the national team between 1955 and 1968. He participated at the 1958, 1964 and 1967 World Men's Handball Championship.

Received Handball Statuet in 2000.

References

Year of birth missing (living people)
Living people
Norwegian male handball players